The Koningo (Swahili: Wakinongo) are an extinct Tanzanian ethnic and linguistic group that lived on the slopes of Mount Meru in present day Arusha City District, Meru District and Arusha District of Arusha Region. They were described as a hunter-gatherer society that preexisted the Wameru people in the 17th century.

References

Ethnic groups in Tanzania
Indigenous peoples of East Africa
Indigenous peoples of Arusha Region
Extinct ethnic groups